Evgeny Maksimovich Novikov (born 19 September 1990) is a former Russian rally driver who competed in the World Rally Championship from 2007 to 2013.

Career 

Born in Moscow, Novikov won the Russian Rally Cup in 2006 and finished runner-up in both Estonian and Russian national championships in 2007. The 2007 season also saw him debut in the World Rally Championship at the season-ending 2007 Wales Rally GB.

In the 2008 season, Novikov contested a full six-event Production World Rally Championship programme as the series' youngest driver. He retired in four rallies and collected his only PWRC points at the Rally Japan, where he impressively led the category until suspension problems on the last stage dropped him narrowly behind Juho Hänninen. He still managed to stay 2.9 seconds ahead of Toshi Arai and with the eight points for the second place, he placed 13th in the championship standings.

For the 2009 season, Novikov was signed by the debuting Citroën Junior Team, Citroën Total's satellite team. With Sébastien Ogier and Conrad Rautenbach as his teammates, he will drive the Citroën C4 WRC in at least eight of the twelve rallies. He scored his first WRC points with a fifth place at the Rally d'Italia Sardegna, and his first stage win in the following event, the Acropolis Rally in Greece. He became both the first Russian and the youngest-ever driver to top the time sheets in the series.

After one year off from competition, Novikov returned to the World Rally Championship partway through in the 2011 season, making his first appearance at the Rally Mexico in a Stobart M-Sport-prepared Ford. He competed in eight of the thirteen rallies, scoring twelve points over the course of the season to finish the year seventeenth overall.

In 2012, Novikov joined M-Sport full-time. He scored his first podium at the 2012 Rally de Portugal, finishing third overall. He was promoted to second place when Citroën driver Mikko Hirvonen was excluded from the results.

For the 2013 season, Novikov joined the Qatar M-Sport WRT alongside Mads Østberg.

At the beginning of the 2013 Acropolis Rally, Novikov was the early leader after winning the first 2 stages and had a 40-second lead over Jari-Matti Latvala after stage 3. A puncture dropped him down to 8th and ruled him out for his maiden win, Latvala eventually won the rally.

Novikov failed to secure a drive for the 2014 season.

Complete WRC results

PWRC results

References

External links 

 
 Novikov at eWRC-results.com

1990 births
Living people
Russian rally drivers
Sportspeople from Moscow
World Rally Championship drivers
Citroën Racing drivers
M-Sport drivers